State Highway 256 (SH 256) is a state highway that runs from Silverton in northern Texas east to a junction with US 83 near Wellington, close to the Oklahoma border.

History
SH 256 was first designated on November 5, 1937, from Silverton to Memphis. On September 20, 1938, SH 256 was extended to Plainview. On May 19, 1942, the section from Plainview to Silverton was cancelled from the designation. On January 7, 1948 the route assumed its current form as the designation was extended east from Memphis to the junction with US 83. The section added was formerly FM 30.

Route description
The highway's western terminus is the intersection with SH 207 at Silverton in Briscoe County. SH 256 is known as Lone Star Street in Silverton. The highway is co-routed with SH 86 for a short distance as it runs east. The route then runs past Caprock Canyons State Park and turns toward the northeast, where it junctions with SH 70. After a brief co-routing with SH 70, the highway continues east through Lakeview to a junction with US 287 in Memphis. The highway is known as Noel Street in Memphis. The route then runs east to its final junction with US 83 in Childress County. Counties traversed by the highway include Briscoe, Hall and Childress. Most of the terrain covered by the highway is sparsely populated ranch country.

Junction list

References

External links

 Texas official travel map at the Texas Department of Transportation (Adobe Acrobat format, magnification required for legibility)
 Satellite image of bridge on SH 256 at Google Maps

256
Transportation in Briscoe County, Texas
Transportation in Hall County, Texas
Transportation in Childress County, Texas